Pyramid Hill may refer to:

Pyramid Hill (Hong Kong), a peak in eastern New Territories of Hong Kong (part of Ma On Shan Country Park)
Pyramid Hill, Victoria, a town in Victoria, Australia in the Shire of Loddon